Public holidays in New Zealand (also known as statutory holidays) consist of a variety of cultural, national, and religious holidays that are legislated in New Zealand. Workers can get a maximum of 12 public holidays (eleven national holidays plus one provincial holiday) and a minimum of 20 annual leave days a year.

History 
Bank holidays in New Zealand originated with a celebration of St Andrew's Day in 1857. Nationwide public holidays began with the Bank Holidays Act 1873, which was based on the UK Bank Holidays Act 1871. Initially there was some resistance to it.

Anniversary days celebrated, from as early as 1843, the first arrivals of settlers in each province. By 1846 the Wellington Anniversary Day was described as having the appearance of an English Fair.

A "one off" national public holiday was declared by the Prime Minister for 26 September 2022 to allow people to pay their respects for the passing of Queen Elizabeth II, the longest-reigning monarch of New Zealand. South Canterbury Anniversary Day, which was due to be observed on 26 September, was moved to be observed on Friday 11 November.

Matariki

In 2006, Māori Language Commissioner Haami Piripi proposed to make Matariki an official holiday. After public discussion, in 2009 a bill was introduced to make Matariki a public holiday; however, the bill was voted down at its first reading. Prime Minister Jacinda Ardern announced on 7 September 2020 that her government would create a new public holiday to celebrate Matariki should the Labour Party win the 2020 general election. Labour won the election, and in February 2021 Ardern announced that Matariki would become an annual public holiday with a variable date (June or July). The Matariki Public Holiday Bill received royal assent on 11 April 2022. The first Matariki public holiday was observed on 24 June 2022.

National public holidays
In New Zealand there are two types of national public holidays: those that are "Mondayised" and those that are not.

Christmas Day and New Years' Day have always been Mondayised holidays, and from 2013 Waitangi Day and Anzac Day are also Mondayised. If these days fall on a weekend that the employee does not normally work then the holiday is transferred to the following Monday or Tuesday; if the employee would normally work on the particular weekend then it remains a traditional holiday and the employee is entitled to that day off on pay. If they would normally work on both days, they are only entitled to the traditional holiday and the Mondayised holiday is treated as a normal work day. Other public holidays are only taken on the day they fall and only employees who would have otherwise worked that day are entitled to a paid day off.

All workers who work on a public holiday must be paid time-and-a-half, and if it would otherwise be a normal working day for them, be given an alternative holiday (known as a day in lieu). Payment for the alternative holiday is equivalent relevant daily pay for the particular alternative day taken, had they have worked it.

While shops may trade on most public holidays, there are special trading restrictions on Christmas Day, Good Friday, and before 1 pm on Anzac Day. On those days, generally only dairies, petrol stations, pharmacies, restaurants, cafés, and shops within an airport or train station may open. In recent years, there have been deliberate violations of these trading restrictions on Good Friday by garden centres (previously, garden centres were exempt from these restrictions).

Some areas were granted exemptions under the former Shop Trading Hours Act 1977, which allow them to trade on Christmas Day, Good Friday and before 1 pm on Anzac Day, subject to conditions and subject to any other law to the contrary (e.g. the Sale and Supply of Alcohol Act 2012 prohibits alcohol sales on these days). These areas include Paihia, Picton, and Queenstown.

List of statutory holidays
Statutory holidays are legislated by several Acts of Parliament, particularly the Holidays Act 2003.

Waitangi Day and Anzac Day are always commemorated on the exact date, as they remember specific historical events. The statutory holidays, however, are Mondayised.

Provincial anniversary days 
In addition to the eleven national public holidays, section 44 of the Holidays Act 2003 specifies as public holidays the anniversary days of each province (or the day locally observed as that day) to celebrate the founding days or landing days of the first colonists of the various colonial provinces. These are only celebrated within each province, not nationwide. Exact dates of the various provinces' anniversary days are not specifically stated in the act, and are instead determined by historical convention and local custom. The regions covered are set by provincial district (as they stood when abolished in 1876), plus Southland, the Chatham Islands, South Canterbury, and Northland. The actual observance days can vary even within each province and is due to local custom, convenience or the proximity of seasonal events or other holidays and may differ from the official observance day.

Annual leave and non-working days
In addition to the above holidays, from 1 April 2007 all workers must be given four weeks annual leave, often taken in the summer Christmas – New Year period. In many industries there is a Christmas – New Year shutdown of business.  With only three working days between Christmas and New Year, many workers take this time off, as they can have a ten-day summer break for only three days leave.  Many retail outlets also hold sales at this time to stimulate business while others close down due to low demand for services.  The days from 25 December to 15 January are not considered to be working days for official government purposes. The public counters of most government departments do open on weekdays during this period, though often only a limited service may be available.

School holidays
State schools have a 4-term year, of about ten weeks each and usually with a two-week holiday between terms. Although standard term dates are set by the Ministry of Education each year, schools can vary these to account for local holidays and school closures due to weather. The first term commences in late January or early February. Occasionally, Easter holidays and/or Anzac Day may fall within these holidays. The holiday between terms two and three is generally known as the midwinter break and occurs in July, while that between terms 3 and 4 occurs in late September, early October. Term four ends in mid December, generally a week or two before Christmas, though for many senior students this term ends after their final NCEA examination in late November or early December.

One-off public holidays 
On 26 September 2022, New Zealand observed a one-off public holiday to commemorate the death of the late monarch: Queen Elizabeth II.

Proposals for new holidays
Following the death of Sir Edmund Hillary in 2008, the Green Party proposed a public holiday in his honour. There is also support in some quarters for the old Dominion Day holiday to be revived as "New Zealand Day".

Proposals for abolition of holidays

From the 1950s to the 1970s it was frequently suggested that the Provincial Anniversary holidays be abolished, as the Provinces ceased to exist in 1876.

Before Waitangi Day was made a national public holiday it was sometimes suggested that a Waitangi Day holiday should replace the anniversary days, and the Waitangi Day Act 1960 made provision for this. Waitangi Day was eventually made an additional holiday and the provincial holidays lived on, primarily because most regions had long established events on those weekends.

A small minority of people advocate the abolition of the Waitangi Day holiday, but it is regularly suggested that a less controversial day, such as Anzac Day (25 April) or Dominion Day (26 September), be made New Zealand's national day.

See also 
 List of unofficial observances in New Zealand

References

External links
 Employment New Zealand Public holidays
 Employment New Zealand Public holidays - Public holidays and anniversary dates
 Employment New Zealand Public holidays in iCalendar format
 School Terms and Holidays, Ministry of Education

 
New Zealand
Holidays